Sir Richard Butler, 5th Baronet (1699 – 25 November 1771) was an Irish politician and baronet.

Early life
He was the eldest son of James Butler and Frances ( Abney) Parker Butler. His mother was the widow of Sir John Parker, who lived at Fermoyle in County Longford.

His father was the second son of Sir Thomas Butler, 3rd Baronet and his mother was a daughter of Sir Edward Abney, MP for Leicester.

Career
Butler represented Carlow County in the Irish House of Commons from 1730 to 1761.

In 1732, he succeeded his uncle Pierce as baronet.

Personal life
In 1728, he married Henrietta Percy (1701–1794), daughter of Sir Henry Percy and Eliza ( Paul) Percy. Her grandfather was Sir Anthony Percy, Lord Mayor of London in 1699. Together, they had four sons and six daughters, including: 

 Judith Butler  (1730–1775), who married Thomas Tennant, Jr.
 Sir Thomas Butler, 6th Baronet (1735–1772), MP for Carlow County and Portarlington who married Dorothea Bayly, only daughter of Very Rev. Edward Bayly, Archdeacon of Dublin.
 James Butler (1736–1787), a Captain in the 1st Regiment of Horse who died unmarried.
 Henrietta Butler (b. 1738), who married Nicholas Gordon.
 Jane Butler (1741–1802), who married Nicholas Trench, son of Richard Trench. 
 Eleanor Butler (b. 1742), who married Edward Eustace, son of James Eustace, in 1765.
 Pierce Butler (1744–1822), a soldier, Founding Father, signatory of the U.S. Constitution, and South Carolina's inaugural Senator in the U.S. Senate.
 William Butler of Broomville (1747–1789), who married Henrietta Nixon, daughter of Abraham Nixon.

Sir Richard died on 25 November 1771 and was succeeded by his eldest son Thomas.

Descendants
His great-grandson, hereditary and absentee plantation owner Pierce Mease Butler, authorized The Great Slave Auction of 1859 to pay gambling debts.

References

1699 births
1771 deaths
17th-century Irish people
Irish MPs 1727–1760
Members of the Parliament of Ireland (pre-1801) for County Carlow constituencies
Politicians from County Carlow
Richard
Butler baronets, of Cloughgrenan